The Super Heavyweight class in the boxing at the 1996 Summer Olympics competition was the heaviest class at the 1996 Summer Olympics in Atlanta, United States. The weight class was open for boxers weighing more than 91 kilograms. The competition in the Alexander Memorial Coliseum started on July 20, 1996 and ended on August 4, 1996.

Qualified boxers

Medalists

Results

References

External links
amateur-boxing

Heavyweight, Super